"Dribble" is a song by Australian singer-songwriter Sycco, released on through Wilder and Future Classic 17 July 2020 as the lead single from her debut extended play Sycco's First EP (2021).

"Dribble" was written and recorded in four hours by Sycco alongside producer and musician Edward Quinn.

"Dribble" received multiple accolades, placing at number 29 in Triple J's Hottest 100 of 2020 and receiving two awards at the 2021 Queensland Music Awards, for Song of the Year and Pop Song of the Year.

Background
In a press statement, Sycco said: "This track was written in four hours. [Producer] Ed and I were tired and hungover, which maybe explains why it sounds a little dark. The guitar synth was added at the last minute but I can't imagine the song without it now."

In an interview with Atwood Magazine, McLeod said: "This song was inspired by someone talking in their sleep and me trying to work out the underlying meaning from it. I guess because there literally was no meaning from it, I was like, 'Ah, there [sic] – just dribbling' and then the concept of talking nonsense came about."

Music video
The music video was released on 16 July 2020. It was directed by Madeline Randall and Summer King.

Critical reception
Mitch Mosk from Atwood Magazine called the song "stunning" saying, "raw yet polished, it's a feverish indulgence of soaring vocals and dynamic synths reminiscent of Glass Animals' How to Be a Human Being, and it's a perfect introduction to Sycco for those who haven't met her yet. An intense immersion of psychedelia washes over the senses, coming to a peak in the chorus as the artist invites all to dwell in her wondrous world".

Describing Sycco as "sounding like a soulful, distant relative of Benee", Emma Jones of Purple Sneakers wrote: "her neo-soul vocals perfectly pierce the rich, thick and inescapable grooves of "Dribble", amplifying the lush production and sass-laden guitars to deliver one of this year's most exciting singles yet." Jones continued, stating: "Sycco pulls off the ambitious track with ease, and builds upon the already impressive foundation she's laid with songs like "Nicotine" and "Peacemaker".

Accolades
"Dribble" placed at number 29 in Triple J's Hottest 100 of 2020.

Awards and nominations

Queensland Music Awards

! 
|-
! scope="row" rowspan="2"| 2021
| rowspan="2"| "Dribble"
| Song of the Year
| rowspan="2" 
| rowspan="2"| 
|-
| Pop Song of the Year
|}

Track listings

Credits and personnel
Adapted from Spotify.
 Sasha McLeod – vocals, writing, production
 Edward Quinn – writing, production

References

 

2020 singles
2020 songs
Sycco songs
Song recordings produced by Sycco
Songs written by Sycco
Future Classic singles